The bidding process for the 2023 AFC Asian Cup was the process by which the location for the 2023 AFC Asian Cup would be chosen as the hosts.

First bidding process
The AFC Competitions Committee confirmed on 12 April 2016 that four countries expressed interest in hosting the 2023 AFC Asian Cup: China, Indonesia, South Korea and Thailand. Indonesia, however, was under FIFA suspension during that period. Those countries met the deadline to submit all documents on 31 March 2016. The winning bid was originally set to be announced at the AFC Congress in May 2018, but the congress was moved to 31 October. Later on, South Korea, Indonesia and Thailand withdrew for various reasons, thus China was designated to be the host on 4 June 2019, before the 69th FIFA Congress, in Paris, France.

Chinese bid 

 China – In February 2013, China suggested interest in hosting the 2019 AFC Asian Cup. Nine cities, Beijing, Dalian, Nanjing, Xi'an, Chengdu, Qingdao, Changsha, Guangzhou and Wuhan, were suggested by the Chinese Football Association (CFA) as potential host cities for the tournament. However, in September 2013, the CFA withdrew its bid to focus on player development. In December 2015, the CFA confirmed their intention to bid for the 2023 AFC Asian Cup. China previously hosted the 2004 Asian Cup where they reached the final but lost 3–1 to neighbours Japan. It was reported that Beijing, Tianjin, Guangzhou, Nanjing, Xi'an, Wuhan, Chengdu, Qingdao, Shenyang, Changsha, Ningbo and Luoyang were suggested by the Chinese Football Association (CFA) as potential host cities for the tournament. Later, in March 2019, it was reported that after evaluation, China officially proposed to bid for the 2023 Asian Cup.

The following were the host cities and venues selected for China's bid:
Beijing – Beijing National Stadium, capacity 81,000
Changsha – Helong Stadium, capacity 55,000
Chengdu – Chengdu Sports Center, capacity 42,000
Guangzhou – Tianhe Stadium, capacity 54,896
Luoyang – Luoyang Stadium, capacity 39,888
Nanjing – Nanjing Olympic Sports Center, capacity 61,443
Ningbo – Ningbo City Stadium, capacity 36,000 
Qingdao – Yizhong Sports Center, capacity 45,000
Shenyang – Shenyang Olympic Sports Center Stadium, capacity 60,000
Tianjin – Tianjin Olympic Centre Stadium, capacity 54,696
Wuhan – Wuhan Sports Center Stadium, capacity 60,000
Xi'an – Shaanxi Province Stadium, capacity 50,100

Cancelled bids

India
 India – India expressed their interest in hosting the competition having never hosted it before. The All India Football Federation was keen to host more international tournaments in the country including the 2020 FIFA U-20 Women's World Cup because of a major infrastructural development of football in the country, by virtue of being hosts for the 2017 FIFA U-17 World Cup and did bid for the 2019 FIFA U-20 World Cup but lost out to Poland. However, India submitted their expression of interest beyond the deadline that was set for March 2017. Possible host cities included Navi Mumbai, New Delhi, Bangalore, Kochi, Guwahati, Chennai, Kolkata, Margao, Pune and Jamshedpur. India later withdrew its bid in October 2018, and chose to focus on the 2020 FIFA U-17 Women's World Cup which India would have hosted before its deferral to 2021 and eventual cancellation due to the COVID-19 pandemic. Instead, the country would later be the host of the 2022 edition, which was later moved following the suspension of AIFF by FIFA. On 26 August 2022, FIFA lifted the ban from the AIFF.

Indonesia
 Indonesia – AFC accepted Indonesia as a candidate on 12 April 2016. Indonesia previously hosted in 2007, along with Thailand, Vietnam and Malaysia. The AFC announced on 6 July 2017 that Indonesia have withdrawn from bidding. In the same year, the country will host the 2023 FIBA Basketball World Cup with two other Asian countries Philippines and Japan. However, with China's withdrawal, Indonesia again resubmitted the bid to host the competition until it was withdrawn by AFC due to security reasons.[see below]

Thailand
 Thailand – Thailand previously hosted in 1972, and also co-hosted in 2007 along with Indonesia, Malaysia and Vietnam. On 21 July 2017, the Football Association of Thailand notified the AFC their decision to withdraw from bidding. Thailand expressed interest in bidding for the 2023 FIFA Women's World Cup but was not in the final list of countries that submitted their bids for the event which was awarded to Australia and New Zealand.

South Korea
 South Korea – South Korea expressed their interest in hosting the next tournament. South Korea last hosted in 1960, which was the second consecutive and last time they have won the tournament. The eight host cities were Suwon, Goyang, Hwaseong, Cheonan, Gwangju, Jeonju, Busan and Seogwipo. On 15 May 2019, South Korea withdrew their bid to focus on co-bidding for the 2023 FIFA Women's World Cup with North Korea. The joint bid was also withdrawn on 13 December, with no agreement made between FIFA and the South Korean government over the use of an organizing committee. Following China's withdrawal from hosting, South Korea again submitted its bid to host the competition until it was failed.[see below]

Concerns and withdrawal
The tournament was originally scheduled to be held in China. However, on 14 May 2022, AFC announced that China would not be able to host the tournament due to the exceptional circumstances caused by the COVID-19 pandemic.

Second bidding process
Following China's withdrawal from hosting of the competition due to the country's COVID-19 pandemic, the second round of bidding was announced on 17 October 2022.

Confirmed bids

Qatar

 Qatar – On 18 July 2022, it was confirmed by AFC that Qatar submitted its bidding documents to host the AFC Asian Cup in 2023. The country previously hosted the 1988 AFC Asian Cup and 2011 AFC Asian Cup, with Qatar reaching the quarter-finals in the latter edition. Qatar are the current AFC Asian champions. Qatar hosted the 2021 FIFA Arab Cup last year and will be hosting the 2022 FIFA World Cup later this year. They also bid to host the 2027 AFC Asian Cup until that bid was withdrawn following the country being chosen to host in 2023.

The following were the host cities and venues selected for Qatar's bid, originally for 2027:
Al Khor – Al Bayt Stadium, capacity 66,036
Al Rayyan - Ahmad bin Ali Stadium, capacity 41,143
Al Rayyan –  Education City Stadium, capacity 41,455
Al Wakrah – Al Janoub Stadium, capacity 40,336
Doha – Khalifa International Stadium, capacity 40,696
Doha – Al Thumama Stadium, capacity 40,125
Doha – Stadium 974, capacity 41,860
Doha – Thani bin Jassim Stadium, capacity 21,175
Doha – Qatar University Stadium, capacity 20,600
Lusail – Lusail Iconic Stadium, capacity 86,239

South Korea

 South Korea – On 20 June 2022, South Korea announced its bid to host the 2023 AFC Asian Cup. South Korea only hosted a single edition before, the 1960 AFC Asian Cup, where the country claimed its second Asian Cup title.

The following were the host cities and venues selected for South Korea's bid:
Busan – Busan Asiad Main Stadium, capacity 53,769
Cheonan – Cheonan Stadium, capacity 26,000
Daejeon – Daejeon World Cup Stadium, capacity 40,903
Goyang – Goyang Stadium, capacity 41,311
Gwangju – Gwangju World Cup Stadium, capacity 39,655
Hwaseong – Hwaseong Stadium, capacity 35,270
Incheon – Incheon Munhak Stadium, capacity 51,234; Incheon Football Stadium, capacity 19,298
Daegu – Daegu World Cup Stadium, capacity 66,422
Seoul – Seoul World Cup Stadium capacity 66,704; Seoul Olympic Stadium, capacity 69,950
Suwon – Suwon World Cup Stadium, capacity 43,923

Cancelled bids

Australia
 Australia – On 21 June 2022, Australia declared an interest in hosting the Asian Cup. They are also hosting the 2023 FIFA Women's World Cup in the same year. However, on 2 September, Football Australia announced that it would not proceed with submitting a formal bid.

The following were the temporary host cities and venues selected for Australia's bid: 

 Melbourne - Melbourne Cricket Ground, capacity 100,000; Docklands Stadium, capacity 56,000; Melbourne Rectangular Stadium, capacity 30,000

 Sydney - Stadium Australia, capacity 83,000; Sydney Football Stadium, capacity 42,000; Western Sydney Stadium, capacity 30,000

 Brisbane - Lang Park, capacity 52,000

 Newcastle - Newcastle Stadium, capacity 33,000

 Canberra - Canberra Stadium, capacity 25,000

 Perth - Perth Rectangular Stadium, capacity 22,000

 Adelaide - Hindmarsh Stadium, capacity 16,500

Indonesia
 Indonesia – On 28 June 2022, Indonesia submitted its bid documents to host the AFC Asian Cup in 2023, confirmed by the president of PSSI, Mochamad Iriawan. Indonesia has hosted only one Asian Cup, the 2007 AFC Asian Cup, where they hosted it alongside Malaysia, Thailand and Vietnam. There has been fears about conflicting schedule if Indonesia wins the bid as the country also hosts the 2023 FIFA U-20 World Cup. However, on 15 October, AFC decided to withdraw Indonesia from the bidding.

The following were the host cities and venues selected for Indonesia's bid: 

 Jakarta - Jakarta International Stadium, capacity 82,000; Gelora Bung Karno Stadium, capacity 77,193

 Bogor - Pakansari Stadium, capacity 30,000

 Gianyar - Kapten I Wayan Dipta Stadium, capacity 18,000

 Pekari - Wibawa Mukti Stadium, capacity 30,000; Patriot Stadium, capacity 30,000

 Surakarta - Manahan Stadium, capacity 25,000

 Palembang - Gelora Sriwijaya Stadium, capacity 23,000

 Surabaya - Gelora Bung Tomo Stadium, capacity 45,000

Previously interested in bids

Japan
 Japan – Japan initially announced its interests in hosting the competition, but it was not among the countries that submitted the bid to host it.

Notes

References

bids
AFC Asian Cup bids